Miriam B. Goodman is an American neuroscientist and biologist. She is currently the Mrs. George A. Winzer Professor of Cell Biology at Stanford University. At Stanford she is also Chair of Molecular and Cellular Physiology. Goodman's lab is currently working to develop a mechanistic model of sensation in C. elegans.

Goodman holds a Bachelor of Science in biochemistry from Brown University (1986) and a doctorate in Neurobiology from the University of Chicago (1995).

Goodman is a member of the Society for Neuroscience, Biophysical Society, and Genetics Society of America.

References

External links 
 
 Stanford profile

Living people
Year of birth missing (living people)
American women biologists
American women neuroscientists
Brown University alumni
University of Chicago alumni
Stanford University faculty
21st-century biologists